Ben Bowditch is an English footballer who played as a midfielder. A Tottenham Hotspur youth product, he went on to play for Colchester United, Barnet and Cambridge City.

Career
Bowditch started his playing career at Tottenham Hotspur, however due to constant injury they released him from his contract. After his release from Tottenham, Bowditch went to Denmark to play for Akademisk Boldklub in Copenhagen. On returning to England he joined Colchester United but after an injury hit season he was released from his contract. He played for Barnet and left the club after the 2005–06 season. He has represented the English national side at under-16, 17, 19 and 20 levels.

In November 2019, he signed a short-term deal to play for non-league Stowmarket Town, scoring on his club debut in the FA Vase.

Personal life
Bowditch has had a number of injuries during his playing career which hampered him. At the end of his career he started Bows Soccer Academy.

His younger brother Dean, played for Milton Keynes Dons, as a striker.

References

External links

1984 births
Living people
English footballers
Association football midfielders
England youth international footballers
Tottenham Hotspur F.C. players
Colchester United F.C. players
Akademisk Boldklub players
Barnet F.C. players
Yeading F.C. players
Cambridge City F.C. players
St Albans City F.C. players
Bishop's Stortford F.C. players
Thurrock F.C. players
Concord Rangers F.C. players
A.F.C. Sudbury players
Potters Bar Town F.C. players
English expatriate footballers
English expatriate sportspeople in Denmark
Expatriate men's footballers in Denmark